Abdoulaye M'Baye (born November 3, 1988, in Berck, France) is a French basketball player who plays for French Pro A league club Gravelines.

Honours
Leaders Cup (1): 2013

References

1988 births
Living people
BCM Gravelines players
French men's basketball players
JDA Dijon Basket players
SIG Basket players
Shooting guards